is a volcano on Okushiri Island in Okushiri, Hokkaidō, Japan. The volcano is mostly rhyolitic.

References
Geographical Survey Institute

Mountains of Hokkaido